The gold-and-white marmoset (Mico chrysoleucos), also known as the golden-white tassel-ear marmoset, is a species of marmoset, a small monkey endemic to the Amazon rainforest in eastern Amazonas state, Brazil.

References

gold-and-white marmoset
Mammals of Brazil
Endemic fauna of Brazil
gold-and-white marmoset
Taxa named by Johann Andreas Wagner